King Fuad, also spelled King Fouad, may refer to two different Kings of Egypt:

Fuad I of Egypt (1868–1936)
Fuad II of Egypt (born in 1952)